Bongwon Temple (or Bongwonsa) is a South Korean Buddhist temple in Bongwon-dong, Seodaemun-gu, Seoul, near Yonsei University.

Situated to the northeast of the university on the hillside of Ahn Mountain, this is the head temple of the Taego Order of Korean Buddhism. It was founded in 889 by Master Doseon and located on the current site of Yonsei University. It moved to its present location in 1748.

Part of the temple was destroyed in 1950 during the Korean War. In 1966 a new hall was built, but this was later moved to another part of the city. In 1991, while a new Hall of 3000 Buddhas was being built, a fire destroyed the Main Buddha Hall, which was rebuilt in 1994.

In the summer of 2004, it was discovered that serial killer Yoo Young-Cheol had buried around eleven bodies of his victims near the temple.

More than 50 monks live at the temple and are engaged in education and social welfare work.

16 Arhat statues 

In the garden of the Buddhist Temple one can find 16 white statues.

These are the 16 Arhat - the Enlightened ones. In Theravada Buddhism and in Mahayana Buddhism, the Arhat (saint) has attained enlightenment and may choose to guide others or not. The 16 Arhats are all pictured here representing their own paths to enlightenment - which may, or may not, be the same as someone else's. The Arhats here would be suggesting one should find one's own path instead of trying to follow another's.

With the 16 Arhats of Theravada Buddhism, the message is simply "I did this. You can do this too. Find your own way" while the same sort of saint as understood by Mahayana Buddhism would be saying, "I did this. You can do this too. Let me show you the way."

See also
Doseon
Taego Order
List of Buddhist temples in Seoul
Korean Buddhist temples
Korean Buddhism

External links

Temple website 

Religious organizations established in the 9th century
Buddhist temples in Seoul
Taego Buddhist temples
Seodaemun District
9th-century establishments in Korea
9th-century Buddhist temples
Religious buildings and structures completed in 889